Tolpia crispus is a moth of the family Erebidae first described by Michael Fibiger in 2007. It is known from Borneo.

The wingspan is about 17 mm. The hindwing is brown and the underside unicolorous brown.

References

Micronoctuini
Taxa named by Michael Fibiger
Moths described in 2007